Jimmy Neutron: Boy Genius is a 2001 American computer-animated science fiction comedy film produced by Nickelodeon Movies, O Entertainment and DNA Productions, and distributed by Paramount Pictures. The film was directed by John A. Davis and written by Davis and producer Steve Oedekerk. Its voice cast includes Debi Derryberry, Patrick Stewart, Martin Short, Rob Paulsen, and Jeffrey Garcia. The film follows the title character, a schoolboy with super-genius intelligence, who must save all of the parents of his hometown from a race of egg-like aliens known as the Yolkians.

The idea for Jimmy Neutron was first created by Davis in the 1980s, in which he wrote a script for a short film titled Runaway Rocketboy and starring a prototype character for Jimmy named Johnny Quasar. After coming across the abandoned script several years later, Davis decided that it would be a good idea to revisit it and retool it as a computer-animated short and potential TV series. A 40-second demo was animated using LightWave 3D and gained popularity at the 1995 SIGGRAPH convention where it was shown off, grabbing the attention of Oedekerk and leading DNA Productions to develop an extended TV pilot. After a successful pitch to Nickelodeon, a 13-minute-long TV episode was developed, and Nickelodeon, impressed with both the character and the 3D technology, raised the possibility of making both a TV series and a full-length feature film. Davis, in turn, suggested that the film be made first, so that the development team could create the assets at theatrical quality and reuse them in the TV series. Production officially began in early 2000 and was completed in roughly 24 months, with the studio considerably raising its staff count and expanding its studio space. Jimmy Neutron was the first computer animated film to be created entirely with off-the-shelf animation software, including LightWave and project:messiah.

Backed by a strong pre-release campaign, Jimmy Neutron: Boy Genius was released on December 21, 2001 and was a box office success, grossing $103 million worldwide against a $30 million budget. It earned generally positive reviews for its characters, humor, vocal performances, and sense of charm, fun, and wit. It was nominated for the inaugural Academy Award for Best Animated Feature in 2001, ultimately losing to Shrek. It was the only animated Nickelodeon film to be nominated in that category for nearly a decade until Rango (2011) was nominated and won.

Due to its success, the film was continued into an animated television series called The Adventures of Jimmy Neutron, Boy Genius, which premiered on July 20, 2002, and ended on November 25, 2006. Four years later, a spin-off series called Planet Sheen was produced, focusing on Jimmy's friend Sheen Estevez. This series premiered on October 2, 2010 (alongside T.U.F.F. Puppy), and ended on February 15, 2013.

A simulator ride based on the film called Jimmy Neutron's Nicktoon Blast was set to take place after the events of the film and featured guest appearances by other Nicktoons characters. It opened at Universal Studios Florida on April 11, 2003, and closed on August 18, 2011.

Plot
Eleven-year-old boy genius Jimmy Neutron lives in Retroville with his parents, Judy and Hugh, and his robot dog, Goddard. Jimmy's friends are overweight Carl Wheezer and hyperactive Sheen Estevez, and his long-standing rival, intelligent classmate Cindy Vortex, teases him for his small stature. After Jimmy launches a communications satellite into space, hoping to contact alien life, he crashes his makeshift rocket into his house's roof, upsetting his mother. When Jimmy, Carl and Sheen learn of the opening of Retroland, an amusement park, popular kid Nick Dean convinces the boys to sneak out and attend. Judy refuses to let him attend the park that night. After his jetpack accidentally starts a fire in the house, she grounds him. Taking Nick's advice, Jimmy uses his shrink ray invention to sneak out and meets Carl and Sheen at Retroland for a night of fun.

Meanwhile, Jimmy's satellite is intercepted by the Yolkians, a race of egg-like aliens from the planet Yolkus. Their leader, King Goobot, views Jimmy's message and notices a picture featuring his parents, declaring his search complete. The Yolkians arrive on Earth and abduct all the adults in Retroville, except Jimmy's teacher Miss Fowl (due to being shrunken down to a small size by Jimmy's shrink ray). As their ships return to space, Jimmy, Carl and Sheen mistake their departure for a shooting star, prompting Jimmy to wish their parents were gone. The next morning, all the children notice the parents are missing and party recklessly. At first, having no parents was fun for the children. But then, the following day, they are miserable and realize they need their parents. Jimmy learns that his satellite has been found and deduces the parents have been abducted. He enlists the children to create rocket ships out of Retroland's rides and they blast off into space after their families.

After braving a meteor shower and camping on an asteroid, Jimmy and company eventually reach Yolkus and find the parents with mind control devices attached to their heads. When Jimmy tries to get the mind-control helmet off of Hugh, Goobot captures them and reveals that Jimmy had led the Yolkians directly to Earth to take their parents, whom they intend to sacrifice to their god Poultra. Jimmy is separated from Goddard by Goobot's bumbling assistant, Ooblar, and is locked in a dungeon with the other children, who blame Jimmy for their predicament. Taking pity on Jimmy, Cindy confesses she and the other children need him and encourages Jimmy to fix things by helping them escape. Using a cellphone owned by Cindy's friend, Libby Folfax, Jimmy contacts Goddard, who escapes from Ooblar and frees the children.

Jimmy and company reach the Yolkians' Colosseum where a giant egg is hatched, releasing Poultra, a gigantic three-eyed alien chicken. As Goobot arranges the parents to be eaten using a mind control remote, Jimmy rallies the children to storm the colosseum and battle the guards while Sheen retrieves an escape vessel, which knocks Poultra on the head upon his return. Jimmy steals the remote from Goobot and the children escape Yolkus with the parents. Goobot arranges a fleet to pursue them, which is all destroyed when the children fly their ship around the surface of the Sun, save for Goobot's vessel. When Goobot and Ooblar mock Jimmy's short size, Jimmy charges at Goobot's ship with Goddard in a flying bike form and uses his shrink ray to enlarge himself into the size of a planet. He then blows Goobot's vessel away into an asteroid, destroying it. Goobot survives and vows revenge. On the return trip to Earth, Jimmy reconciles with his parents, admitting that despite his intelligence, he still depends on them. The next day, Jimmy and Carl have eggs in an egg cup for breakfast, when Jimmy's parents drink one of his scientific experiments, which causes significant belching, thinking it is a real soda can. They all laugh while Goddard is seen outside flying to chase a bird.

In the mid-credits scene, the still-shrunken Miss Fowl is seen riding on an apple worm, named Mr. Wiggles, on her way to the cafeteria in the elementary school hall.

Cast

 Debi Derryberry as Jimmy Neutron
 Patrick Stewart as King Goobot V
 Martin Short as Ooblar
 Carolyn Lawrence as Cindy Vortex
 Rob Paulsen as Carl Wheezer, Mr. and Mrs. Wheezer (credited as Carl's Mom and Dad), Kid in Classroom
 Jeffrey Garcia as Sheen Estevez
 Crystal Scales as Libby Folfax and Courtney Tyler
 Frank Welker as Goddard (uncredited), Poultra, Worm, Demon, Girl-Eating Plant, Oyster
 Candi Milo as Nick Dean, Britney, PJ
 Megan Cavanagh as Judy Neutron (credited as Mom), VOX, Mrs. Vortex (credited as Cindy's Mom)
 Mark DeCarlo as Hugh Neutron (credited as Dad), Pilot, Arena Guard, Mr. Vortex (credited as Cindy's Dad)
 Carlos Alazraqui as Mr. Estevez (credited as Sheen's Dad)
 Kimberly Brooks as Zachery, Reporter, Angie
 Andrea Martin as Ms. Winfred Fowl (Credited as Ms. Fowl)
 Billy West as Bobby's Twin Brother, Butch, Old Man Johnson, Robobarber, Yolkian Officer, Jailbreak Cop, Anchor Boy, Flurp Announcer
 Bob Goen and Mary Hart as Yolkian newscasters
 Dee Bradley Baker as NORAD Officer
 Greg Eagles as Mr. Folfax (uncredited)
 David L. Lander as Yolkian Guard, Gus
 Jim Cummings as Ultra Lord, Mission Control, General Bob
 Paul Greenberg as Guard
 Laraine Newman as Hostess
 Jeannie Elias as Little Girl, Camera Person
 Michael Hagiwara as Chris
 Keith Alcorn as Bobby, Kid, Control Yolkian
 Richard Allen as Digital Voice
 Brian Capshaw as Screamer
 Cheryl Ray as Screamer
 Mark Menza as Yolkian Incubator Operator
 Matthew Russell as Hyperactive Kid, Arena Yolkian

Production

Development
The idea for a series about a boy with super-genius powers was first conceived in the 1980s by John A. Davis, who scripted and storyboarded a short narrative titled Runaway Rocketboy, centering around a character named Johnny Quasar (inspired by a facetious nickname that his summer co-workers had coined for him in his youth) who builds a rocket ship and runs away from his parents. Davis stated in an episode of the Nickelodeon Animation Podcast that he initially wrote the concept with the intention of creating it as a live-action film with special effects and matte shots, even going so far as to apply for a grant to fund the project, but found that getting such an investment was difficult since the film was not educational or informative. The idea laid dormant for several years until Davis came across the abandoned script while in the process of moving. Around the same time, Davis' Dallas-based studio, DNA Productions, had just begun experimenting with the use of computer animation after obtaining copies of LightWave 3D. In turn, Davis realized that the film would be fitting as a CGI film, since all of the science fiction set pieces could be entirely modeled in 3-D.

Davis, alongside studio co-founder Keith Alcorn, created a 40-second proof-of-concept demo film which depicted Johnny and his robot dog, Goddard, flying through an asteroid belt and greeting the viewers. Simultaneously, Davis and Alcorn worked to create a story bible outlining a potential television series. The demo short was shown off in 1995 at the SIGGRAPH CGI convention, where it was entered into a competition for LightWave films. The demo quickly garnered notability in the computer animation industry, receiving frequent press coverage in magazines and winning two "Wavey" awards- one for Best Character Animation and another for Best in Show. Among people who caught wind of the film was Steve Oedekerk, the founder of O Entertainment, who saw a still shot of Johnny and Goddard in a CGI magazine. Oedekerk, a strong backer of computer animation, was impressed by the characters' designs – he stated in an interview that the image particularly stood out to him because it "seemed fun" compared to the mostly-photorealistic work being done with computer animation at the time. He cold-called Davis requesting to see a tape of the full short. After watching the demo, as well as seeing the show bible which Davis and Alcorn had developed, Oedekerk expressed interest in helping to pitch their concept to different networks.

After teaming up with O Entertainment, the company began working on developing a full-length episode for a TV series, titled The Adventures of Johnny Quasar, writing an expanded version of the original Runaway Rocket story and tweaking aspects of Johnny's design to make him look more like a child. In Fall 1995, the idea was pitched to Nickelodeon, who expressed immediate interest in the idea. Albie Hecht, the then-president of Nick, was particularly impressed- coining him to be "half Bart Simpson and half Albert Einstein," he strongly praised Johnny's blended personality as an adventurous and intelligent character and one grounded in the reality of childhood, which, according to him, made him "the perfect Nick kid." Following positive reception, Nickelodeon commissioned for a 13-minute pilot episode to be created. After several years of going through the review process, the episode began production in late 1997, and was completed in 1998. The name "Johnny Quasar" was changed at the request of Nickelodeon, who did not want the character to be confused with similarly named ones such as Jonny Quest and Captain Quazar, so Davis brainstormed other character names while walking his dog around the neighborhood block, eventually coming up with the final name, "Jimmy Neutron".

After the pilot was completed, Nickelodeon executives, who were impressed by the pilot and still enthusiastic about the show's potential, raised the prospect of creating a theatrical film to accompany the TV series, much to the surprise of Davis and his team at the studio. During the initial pitch to Nickelodeon, Oedekerk had highlighted the idea that using computer animation would allow the same models and assets to be reused between both a film and a TV show, an idea which Nick held strong faith in. Davis further suggested that the feature film be created first, since the characters being modeled could be created at a higher quality than they would have with a TV budget. Although Nick was worried that it would be more difficult to attract a movie-going audience without the TV show to build an install base for the series, these concerns were answered with a series of short TV interstitials which would begin airing in order to build up hype for the upcoming film.

With a budget of roughly $30 million, production of Jimmy Neutron: Boy Genius was greenlit in Fall 1999, and work began on a script for the film. Production officially started in February 2000 under the direction of Davis. In order to speed up the pace of work for a feature film, the company's staff count was considerably increased from 30 to around 150 employees, and the studio's workspace was also reformed in order to fit such a team of filmmakers. The film was completed in 24 months- roughly half that in which most other CGI films were completed.

Writing
The screenplay for Jimmy Neutron was written by Davis and Oedekerk, as well as Rugrats staff writers David N. Weiss and J. David Stem. In creating the many ideas in Jimmy Neutron, Davis and Oedekerk thought back to their childhoods, trying to think about "what a kid would create if he had the ability to create any kind of gadget." The film was largely inspired by Davis' own love of science fiction which he had since childhood, drawing influence from various sources including Thunderbirds and Ray Harryhausen's stop motion work. Oedekerk's 6-year-old daughter, Zoe, came up with the idea for "burp soda", which ultimately appeared in the movie as one of Jimmy's many inventions. According to Davis, the Ultralord-obsessed Sheen Estevez was inspired by Davis' own love of collecting. Sheen was initially intended to be Japanese, as he was named after the nickname of a Japanese employee who had worked for Davis, but the filmmakers had trouble finding a suitable voice actor of Japanese descent. Incidentally, they changed the character's nationality to Mexican after opening the role to a broader category and eventually settling on Mexican stand-up comic Jeff Garcia.

Animation
Jimmy Neutron was the first computer animated film to be created entirely using commercial animation programs rather than proprietary software, with most animation done using both Lightwave and project:messiah. Characters were first modeled in Lightwave, after which they were rigged and animated in Messiah. Texture painting was done via Adobe Photoshop, while compositing work was completed in Maya Fusion. In addition to serving as executive producer, Alcorn was the film's lead character designer, and created actively simplistic and cartoonish designs in order to avoid overcomplicating production. To animate crowd scenes, methods of simplification were used to make animation less time-consuming: characters that were farther from the camera had less articulation, and animators would duplicate the same characters, offset them to different areas, and change their body parts to differentiate them. One particular scene shows a crowd of 6000 Yolkians, each of which uses one of 30 distinct animation loops.

According to Davis, the character models were intentionally given a "sculpted, graphic look," both to avoid making them look overly realistic and to circumvent the prospect of having to deal with simulating cloth or hair. The over-the-top character designs, in turn, influenced the film world's aesthetic (e.g. cars were modeled to be able to fit the characters' stylistically large heads). Off-the-shelf shaders were favored over ones which created more photorealistic lighting in order to maintain a cartoonish appearance throughout.

Casting
Nancy Cartwright, Pamela Adlon and E. G. Daily  were all considered for the role of Jimmy Neutron before Debi Derryberry was cast for the film and subsequent series. The film was Derryberry's biggest acting role at the time, as previously she had mostly provided minor roles in films and TV shows.

Soundtrack

Official soundtrack
The movie soundtrack was released by Zomba Music, Jive Records, and Nick Records on November 20, 2001, a month prior to the film's release.  It includes covers of DJ Jazzy Jeff and The Fresh Prince's "Parents Just Don't Understand", Thomas Dolby's "She Blinded Me With Science" , and Kim Wilde's "Kids In America".

Original score
Additionally, a promotional CD containing the score by John Debney was released for Academy Award consideration.

Promotion
To promote the film, a series of shorts were created to air on Nickelodeon, with the first one premiering on February 5, 2001. The shorts were tied in with online games available on Nick's website. Clips from the shorts were previously compiled to form a trailer, which was attached to the theatrical release of Rugrats in Paris: The Movie (2000). The shorts would later be included on the film's DVD release.

In April 2001, Nickelodeon Magazine launched a monthly Jimmy Neutron comic strip online. An official trailer debuted two months later with the release of Lara Croft: Tomb Raider. The character Jimmy Neutron made appearances at the 2001 Kids' Choice Awards and appeared in commercials for Trident gum ahead of the film's premiere. Other promotional partners included RadioShack and Mattel, both of which produced toys based on the film. In September 2001, to further raise awareness of the film, Nick launched a series of "pranks" in which Jimmy Neutron would appear in episodes of shows – such as Rugrats and SpongeBob SquarePants – and mischievously alter them using an electronic zapping device.

Release
Jimmy Neutron: Boy Genius was released in theaters on December 21, 2001, by Paramount Pictures.

It was released on VHS and DVD by Paramount Home Entertainment on July 2, 2002. It was re-released on DVD twice, on June 22, 2011, and April 25, 2017. The film received a Blu-ray release on March 8, 2022.

Reception

Critical response
Jimmy Neutron: Boy Genius received generally positive reviews from critics and audiences. The critics' consensus reads: "What Jimmy Neutron lacks in computer animation, it makes up for in charm and cleverness." According to Metacritic, the film has a weighted average score of 65 out of 100 based on 21 reviews, indicating "generally favorable reviews". Audiences polled by CinemaScore gave the film an average grade of "A-" on an A+ to F scale.

Rita Kempley of The Washington Post praised the film, saying that "this little charmer both celebrates and kids the corny conventions of family sitcoms". Nell Minow of Common Sense Media enjoyed the "stylish 3-D computer animation, good characters", giving the film 3 out of 5 stars. Owen Gleiberman of Entertainment Weekly gave this film a grade of "B+", calling it "a lickety-split, madly packed, roller-coaster entertainment that might almost have been designed to make you scared of how much smarter your kids are than you". Paul Tatara of CNN called the film "the most delightfully original children's film of 2001". Roger Ebert of the Chicago Sun-Times gave the film three stars out of four, saying that "it doesn't have the little in-jokes that make Shrek and Monsters, Inc. fun for grown-ups. But adults who appreciate the art of animation may enjoy the look of the picture".

Box office
The film was financially successful, grossing $13,833,228 on its opening weekend in third place behind The Lord of the Rings: The Fellowship of the Ring and Ocean's Eleven and ended up with a total of $80,936,232 domestically, and the film did better overseas grossing $22,056,304 which made a total of $102,992,536 worldwide. It had a budget of roughly $30 million. It is one of only twenty feature films to be released in over 3,000 theaters and still improve on its box office performance in its second weekend, increasing 8.7% from $13,832,786 to $15,035,649.

Awards
Jimmy Neutron: Boy Genius was nominated for the first Academy Award for Best Animated Feature, losing to Shrek. It was the first release from Nickelodeon Movies to receive an Academy Award nomination.

Expanded franchise

A sequel television series, The Adventures of Jimmy Neutron, Boy Genius, ran from July 2002 to November 2006. Another series, Planet Sheen, is a spin-off of the film and its 2002 series. It focuses on Sheen Estevez, and ran from October 2, 2010, to February 15, 2013.

A simulator ride called Jimmy Neutron's Nicktoon Blast opened at Universal Studios Florida on April 4, 2003, and operated until August 18, 2011. It was set after the events of the film and featured guest appearances by other Nicktoons characters.

The Jimmy Timmy Power Hour, a trilogy of television specials, aired between 2004 and 2006.

Cancelled sequel and possible reboot
In February 2002, a sequel was reported in development for a summer 2004 release. Producer Albie Hecht reported to The Los Angeles Times that the sequel "would be made on the same budget as the first, but with a new batch of inventions and adventures in Jimmy's town of Retroville." On June 20, 2002, The Hollywood Reporter reported that writer Kate Boutilier had signed a writing deal with Nickelodeon Movies and Paramount Pictures to write a sequel to the film, but the sequel never materialized. The film was cancelled because the writers could not agree on a story and Alcorn later stated in an interview that "once the TV series came out, there wasn't a lot of incentive to make a movie when fans could simply watch Jimmy Neutron for free at home."

In 2016, director John A. Davis stated that he has a story for a Jimmy Neutron reboot feature that he would like to make, but he is waiting for the "right situation" to make it.

When asked about a reboot in 2020, Rob Paulsen stated "Well, I've got to tell you, man. I go all over the world when we don't have the coronavirus, and people love Carl. They love Carl. I don't think it would be a bad thing at all to reboot Jimmy Neutron. I think that's one of those shows that a lot of people would love to see again. It was very good. Really smart. That wouldn't surprise me."

See also

 List of films featuring extraterrestrials

References

External links
 
 
 
 
 

2001 films
2001 comedy films
2001 animated films
2000s American animated films
2000s adventure comedy films
2000s science fiction comedy films
Alien abduction films
Alien visitations in films
American Christmas films
American children's animated space adventure films
American children's animated science fantasy films
American children's animated comic science fiction films
American computer-animated films
American robot films
Films scored by John Debney
Films about missing people
Films adapted into television shows
Films directed by John A. Davis
Films set on fictional planets
Jimmy Neutron films
Films about size change
DNA Productions films
Nickelodeon Movies films
Nickelodeon animated films
Paramount Pictures films
Paramount Pictures animated films
Films with screenplays by John A. Davis
Films with screenplays by Steve Oedekerk
2000s English-language films
2001 directorial debut films
Animated films about children
2001 computer-animated films